This is a list of the panellists that have appeared on the BBC television programme QI. The show premiered in September 2003, with Stephen Fry as its host. Fry continued hosting until March 2016, when "Series M" concluded and Sandi Toksvig took over. With very few exceptions, each episode features three guest panellists who alongside permanent panellist Alan Davies answer extremely obscure questions. 



Number of appearances per guest panellist

The table below does not include appearances in the unbroadcast pilot, three special episodes, thirteen two-part compilation episodes, and one episode containing outtakes from "Series E".

References

External links 
 QI official website
 QI cast and crew  on IMDb

British television-related lists
Lists of celebrities